Prince Wimbley (born September 22, 1970) is a former American and Canadian football wide receiver in the Canadian Football League (CFL) and Arena Football League (AFL). He played college football at Alabama.

References

External links
Just Sports Stats

1970 births
Living people
Players of American football from Miami
American football wide receivers
Canadian football wide receivers
Alabama Crimson Tide football players
Las Vegas Posse players
Birmingham Barracudas players
Saskatchewan Roughriders players
Hamilton Tiger-Cats players
Players of Canadian football from Miami